George E. White may refer to: 

George E. White (politician) (1848–1935), U.S. Congressman from Illinois
George E. White (missionary) (1861–1946), Christian missionary and witness to the Armenian Genocide